Mumbai Police  is a 2013 Indian Malayalam language neo-noir psychological thriller film written by Bobby-Sanjay and directed by Rosshan Andrrews. It stars Prithviraj Sukumaran, Jayasurya, Rahman in the lead roles along with Kunchan, Aparna Nair, Deepa Vijayan, and debutant Hima Davis in supporting roles. Shweta Menon and Riyaz Khan appear in guest roles. The film is produced by Nisad Haneefa and co-produced by Nivas Haneef and Niyas Haneefa. The background score was composed by Gopi Sundar and the cinematography was handled by G. Diwakaran. The film was edited by Mahesh Narayanan.

Mumbai Police completed filming in 56 days versus the planned schedule was for 60 days. The Khaleej Times identified Mumbai Police as one of the "remarkable box-office success" of 2013. The film got Kerala State Film Award for Best Screenplay and Prithviraj's performance was regarded as one of his career best performances. The film was remade in Telugu as Hunt starring Sudheer Babu in the lead role which was released in 2023.

Plot
Antony "Rascal" Moses is the ACP of Ernakulam, who gets involved in an accident which leads him to suffer partial memory loss. Before the accident, Antony was having a conversation with his brother-in-law  Commissioner of Police Farhan Aman. He informs Farhan that he has solved the murder case of his best friend ACP Aryan John Jacob, who was killed with a sniper during a gallantry awards ceremony at the police parade ground, but before disclosing the name of the murderer, the accident occurs resulting in the partial memory loss. Antony is attacked by assassins at his apartment after he gets discharged, but he fights them off. 

Farhan tells Antony about their relationship with Aryan and the case investigations that Antony has made. The trio were nicknamed as Mumbai Police due to their past in the Mumbai counter terrorism division. Antony's capabilities as a cop being impressive, Farhan reassigns Antony back on the case despite the memory loss. Antony has a hard time adjusting to his new life which starts affecting his profession. As the investigations continues, Antony realizes that he was daredevil cop with an impressive record but was notorious for his use of violence, alcoholism and womanizing. 

Antony finds that the sniper that was used to assassinate Aryan was remote controlled. As his investigation deteriorates, Antony is asked to be removed from the case by his team members but Antony asks for 2 days time in order to solve the case and find the culprit. A man comes to Antony apartment and starts behaving oddly, which confuses Antony and beats him out of his apartment. Antony realizes that he is a closeted homosexual and breaks down in tears. Antony confronts Farhan and asks him to reveal the full audio clip on his voicemail that he send before his accident. 

Before the accident, Antony met Aryan's fiancée Rebecca, who showed Aryan's award speech rehearsal video in which he dedicated the award to Antony. It is then revealed that Antony himself was the one who killed Aryan since he found about his homosexuality and felt he might oust Antony. After seeing the video and breaking down, Antony had confessed to his crimes to Farhan, and also tells that he now really misses the Mumbai Police. After this, Farhan arrests Antony.

Cast

Production 
Shooting started in January 2013, and the movie was released on 3 May 2013.

Reception

Critical response
Sify and Indiaglitz.com called Mumbai Police one of the best recent Malayalam films. Paresh of Rediff.com called the film a " good suspense thriller which will make history for its interesting story." Aswin of The Times of India says that the film " arrests and engages the audience with bold portrayals from a well-chosen cast."

Veeyen of Nowrunning.com praised the writing and said the "dark lined elegance that the movie sports, makes it a gritty, knotty thriller – a hardboiled treat."

Shekhar of Oneindia.in praised the narrative and said the story has surprises.

References

External links 
 
 

2010s Malayalam-language films
Films set in Mumbai
Fictional portrayals of the Kerala Police
Films with screenplays by Bobby-Sanjay
Indian LGBT-related films
Indian thriller films
Films shot in Kochi
Films directed by Rosshan Andrrews
2013 thriller films
Films scored by Gopi Sundar
2013 films
LGBT-related thriller films
2013 LGBT-related films
Malayalam films remade in other languages